Wading Home: A Novel of New Orleans is the second novel by Rosalyn Story.

Plot
A New Orleans family shattered by hurricane Katrina struggles to reunite and recover.

Major themes

Development history

Publication history
 2010, USA, Agate Bolden, Publication date September 24, 2010, Paperback.
 2014, USA, Agate Bolden, Publication date December 10, 2014, Audible Audio Edition.

Adaptations
The novel was adapted as an opera, Wading Home, by composer Mary Alice Rich.

References

External links
 www.agatepublishing.com/titles/wading-home

2010 American novels
African-American novels